The 156th Infantry Division (German: 156. Infanteriedivision) was a German Army infantry division in World War II.

History 
The 156th Infantry Division was raised in April 1945, where it was sent to the eastern front, which was approaching westwards to the German border.

It was known before as Division Nr. 156 (December 1939 - October 1942), Division Baltzer  (November - December 1942) and 156. Reserve-Division (October 1942 -  February 1944).

Commanders 
 Generalleutnant Max Noack (1 September  1939 - 15 August 1942)
 Generalleutnant Richard Baltzer (15 August 1942 - 8 July 1943)
 Generalmajor Johannes Nedtwig (8 July 1943 - September 1943)
 Generalleutnant Richard Baltzer (September 1943 - 27 December 1943)
 Generalleutnant Otto Elfeldt (27 December 1943 - February 1944)
 Generalleutnant Siegfried Rekowski (April 1945 - 8 May 1945)

Operations Officers
Major Herbert Giesenhagen (25 March 1945 – 2 May 1945)

References

Military units and formations established in 1945
Military units and formations disestablished in 1945
Infantry divisions of Germany during World War II